Yelena Ilyina (born 5 May 1967) is a Soviet speed skater. She competed in two events at the 1988 Winter Olympics.

References

1967 births
Living people
Soviet female speed skaters
Olympic speed skaters of the Soviet Union
Speed skaters at the 1988 Winter Olympics
Place of birth missing (living people)